The Akan people are a kwa group living primarily in present-day Ghana and in parts of Ivory Coast and Togo in West Africa. The Akan language (also known as Twi/Fante) are a group of dialects within the Central Tano branch of the Potou–Tano subfamily of the Niger–Congo family. Subgroups of the Akan people include: the Agona, Akuapem, Akwamu, Akyem, Ashanti, Bono, Fante, Kwahu, Wassa, and Ahanta. The Akan subgroups all have cultural attributes in common; most notably the tracing of matrilineal descent in the inheritance of property, and for succession to high political office.

Oral tradition and Origin 

Akan people are believed to have migrated to their current location from the Sahara desert and Sahel regions of Africa into the forest region around the 11th century. Many Akans tell their history as it started in the eastern region of Africa as this is where the ethnogenesis of the Akan as we know them today happened.  Oral traditions of the ruling Abrade (Aduana) Clan relate that Akans originated from the ground. They migrated from the north, they went through Egypt and settled in Nubia (Sudan). Around 500 AD, due to the pressure exerted on Nubia by Axumite kingdom of Ethiopia, Nubia was shattered, and the Akan people moved to the west and established small trading kingdoms. Around 750 AD, these kingdoms grew into Awkar or Koumbi Saleh. 11th century Arab historian Al-Bakri wrote about this great kingdom based on accounts by Berber merchants, who often traded with these ancient Ghanians. Because historians admit the origin of the Akan people is unknown, they don't reject the Sudanese origin and maintain that oral tradition must also be considered. The ancestors of the Akan eventually left for Kong (i.e. present day Ivory Coast). From Kong they moved to Wam and then to Dormaa, located in present-day Bono Region of Ghana. The movement from Kong was necessitated by the desire of the people to find suitable savannah conditions since they were not used to forest life.

History
The kingdom of Bonoman (or Brong-Ahafo) was established as early as the 12th century. Between the 12th and 13th centuries a gold boom in the area brought wealth to numerous Akans. During different phases of the Kingdom of Bonoman, groups of Akans migrated out of the area to create numerous states based predominantly on gold mining and trading of cash crops. This brought wealth to numerous Akan states such as the Akwamu Empire (1550–1650), and ultimately led to the rise of the well known Akan empire, the Empire of Ashanti (1700–1900), the most dominant of the Akan states. From the 15th century to the 19th century, the Akan people dominated gold mining and trading in the region; throughout this period they were among the most powerful groups in Africa. The Akan goldfields, according to Peter Bakewell, were the "highly auriferous area in the forest country between the Komoe and Volta rivers." The Akan goldfield was one of three principal goldfields in the region, along with the Bambuk goldfield, and the Bure goldfield.

This wealth in gold attracted European traders. Initially, the Europeans were Portuguese, soon joined by the Dutch and the British in their quest for Akan gold. The Akan waged war on neighboring states in their geographic area to capture people and sell them as slaves to Europeans (Portuguese) who subsequently sold the enslaved people along with guns to the Akan in exchange for Akan gold. Akan gold was also used to purchase slaves from further up north via the Trans-Saharan route. The Akan purchased slaves to help clear the dense forests within Ashanti. About a third of the population of many Akan states were indentured servants (i.e. Non-Akan peoples). The Akan went from buyers of slaves to selling slaves as the dynamics in the Gold Coast and the New World changed. Thus, the Akan people played a role in supplying Europeans with indentured servants, who were later enslaved for the trans-Atlantic slave trade. In 2006 Ghana apologized to the descendants of slaves for the role the Ashantis had played in the slave trade. Akan people, especially the Ashanti people, fought against European colonialists and defeated them on several occasions to maintain autonomy. This occurred during the Anglo-Ashanti wars: the War of the Golden Stool and other similar battles. By the early 1900s, Ghana was a colony or protectorate of Great Britain, while the lands in the Ivory Coast were under the French. On 6 March 1957, following the decolonization from Great Britain under the leadership of Kwame Nkrumah, the Gold Coast was united with British Togoland and the Northern Region, Upper East Region, and Upper West Region of the Gold Coast to form Ghana. Ivory Coast gained independence on 7 August 1960.

Trans-Atlantic slavery 
Many people across the Americas can trace their lineage to the Akan people due to the trans-Atlantic slave trade. Some notable Akan descendants include the Coromantees in Jamaica, the Akwamu in St. John, and Coffy, who was the leader of the 1763 Berbice slave uprising in Guyana. According to one estimate, roughly ten percent of all slave ships that embarked from the coast of West Africa contained Akan people. Although gold was the primary source of wealth in their economy, the capture and sale of Akan people peaked during the Fante and Ashanti conflicts, resulting in a high number of military captives being sold into slavery. Coromantee soldiers and other Akan captives were known for various slave revolts and plantation resistance tactics. Their legacy is evident within groups such as the Maroons of the Caribbean and South America.

Akan polity

The Akans consider themselves one nation. Akan means first, foremost, indicating the enlightened and civilized. While traditionally matrilineal, they are also united philosophically through 12 patrilineal spirit groups called the Ntoro. Within the Akan nation are branches based on many dialects, widest and possibly the oldest one being used is Twi. Each branch subsequently holds a collection of states and stemming from city-states. The state or Aman are typically ruled by several kings known as Amanhene or Ahemfo. The state  is the basic unit of Akan polity. Several states and city-states can band together to form a confederacy or an empire regardless of clan or abusua they belong to, while those outsides of the Akan tribe or the abusua were usually conquered or annexed via war or mutual agreement. For example, the Guan state of Larteh and the Akyem state of Akropong joined together to form the Akwapim Kingdom to avoid the Akwamu, who the Guan deemed as oppressive. Under the State there are Divisions and under these Divisions are towns and villages.

Akan kings are ranked according to their jurisdiction. The head of an inter-clan Confederacy is usually considered a King, as in the Kings of Ashanti, Fante, Akyem and the Akwapim. Under these are the heads of the constituent states who equates an Emperor that only heads an Empire (e.g. Asante Empire and the Denkyira). In Asante's case, as an Empire, the Asantehene reigned over the non-Oyoko clan city-states and ruled over the kings of those states as an Imperial head or Emperor (a hardly used but an equivalent term for Emperor or the king of kings). Next there are divisional Chiefs, they are primarily arranged according to the five divisions of an Akan army. The Fante army or Asafo formation resembles a cross or an airplane. The battle formation has the Frontline, the West Flank, an East Flank, the main body and the Vanguard. There are, therefore, five divisional chiefs in each Paramountcy. These are followed in rank by the Kings of the city and then the Kings of the town and then king of the suburbs.

The Akan tribe mostly has seven Abusua (Matrilineal clans) in each state. They do not have the same names in each state but each has an equivalent clan (e.g. in Fante areas along the coast, the Asante clan of Oyoko is referred to as Dehyena or Yokofo). The clans are assigned States which they rule by their status as founders of that jurisdiction. The Ashanti Kingdom is ruled by the Oyoko Clan. However, the Bretuo or Twidanfo (in Fante), as well as other clans, rule States, Divisions, Towns, and Villages within the Kingdom. The Fante-speaking tribes usually have the Asona Clan ruling most of their States (like Mankessim). Certain sub-clans or lineages have exclusive rights to some stools within Akanland such as the lineage of Afia Kobi in the Oyoko Clan who alone sits on the Golden Stool of Asante.

The Akans are traditionally a Matrilineal people of the African continent. Matrilineal inheritance makes it easier to trace the line of succession. Within each lineage or House are the branches. The chief of a family is called an Abusuapanyin (or family-elder). Ranking above a family chief (a family's Abusuapanin) is the clan's chief (or clan's Abusuapanyin). These branches are called Jaase or Kitchens. Each Kitchen takes its turn to present a candidate for the stool to the kingmakers of the lineage. Once accepted their candidate rules till death. This means until all the Jaase have presented their candidates they have to wait their turn.

Akan Kings of whatever rank have other noblemen who serve them as sub-chiefs. These sub-chiefs do not have hereditary titles and therefore do not have black stools. Besides, each King has a female co-ruler known as the Queen-mother. The Queen-mother is more like a figurehead representing the King's or Emperor's eldest sister and hence the mother of the next King or Emperor, she could rule as a King if she wishes (e.g. queen-mothers mainly from the House of Asona clan: Nana Abena Boaa who ruled Offinso 1610–1640, Nana Afia Dokuaa who ruled Akyem Abuakwa 1817–1835, and Nana Yaa Asantewaa who ruled Edweso 1896–1900). They present the candidate for consideration as King. An assistant king does not have a Queen-mother as his title is not hereditary.

A Prince or Daakyehen(Fante)(lit Future-king) is any of the members of the lineage eligible to sit on a stool. However, not all noblemen or noblewomen are Princes as some may be ineligible. A prince is not necessarily the son of a King but rather the former King's nephew on the mother's side. As such, nobles strive to achieve the position of a prince in their families or for their children.

A sub-chief does not, however, need to be a nobleman. He only has to be suitable for the position he is to occupy. Some sub-chieftaincy positions can be abolished at will. They include the heads of the ruling house or Mankrado, the Linquist, the Chief Kingmaker or Jaasehen, the Supi or General of the Army, the Captains of the Army or Asafohen(Fante) among others. The way Akans ruled their nation fascinated the tribes of other West African nations and as the Akans conquered or formed alliances with these nations, parts of it were transmitted to them. The British particularly felt the Akan system was highly efficient and tried to establish it throughout their dominions in West Africa using the Indirect Rule System. The Ewes and the Ga-Adangmes with their close affinity to the Akans have modified certain aspects of it to fit their societies.

In Ghana and other modern states where the Akan tribe is located, the Kings, Assistant Kings, Princes, and Noblemen of the Akans serve mostly a symbolic role. Modern politics has side-lined them in national politics although it is common to find that an elected or appointed official to be of Akan royalty. And, especially in the villages and poor areas, traditional Kings are still very important for organizing development, social services and keeping the peace. Some Kings have decided to push ahead with the leadership of their Kingdoms and States in a non-political fashion. The Asantehen and okyehen have emphasized Education and Environmental Sustainability respectively. Others push the national government and its agents to fulfill promises to their people.

In modern Ghana, a quasi-legislative/judicial body known as the House of "Chiefs"(a colonial term to belittle African Kings because of the racist belief to not equate an African King with a European King in rank) has been established to oversee "chieftaincy" and the Government of Ghana as the British Government once did certifies the Chiefs and gazettes them. Several Akan Kings sit at the various levels of the National House of "Chiefs". Each Paramountcy has a Traditional Council, then there is the Regional House of "Chiefs" and lastly the National House of "Chiefs". Akan Kings who once warred with each other and Kings of other nations within Ghana now sit with them to build peace and advocate development for their nations.
The identity of an Akan nation or meta-ethnicity is expressed by the term Akanman.
The Akan word ɔman (plural Aman) which forms the second element in this expression has a meaning much of "community, town, nation, state".  has been translated as "Akanland".

Akan language

Akan refers to the language of the Akan ethnolinguistic group and the Akan language which was and is the most widely spoken and used indigenous language in the Akan tribes.  Each tribe having its own dialect Akan is officially recognized for literacy in the Akan-majority regions, at the primary and elementary educational stage (Primary 1–3) K–12 (education) level, and studied at university as a bachelor's degree or master's degree program. The Akan language is spoken as the predominant language in the Western, Central, Ashanti, Eastern, Brong Ahafo regions of the akan clan. A language with some Akan influence called Ndyuka is also spoken in South America (Suriname and French Guiana), with the Akan language coming to these South American and Caribbean places through the trans-Atlantic slave trade and Akan names and folktales are still used in these South American and Caribbean countries (another example can be seen in the Maroons of Jamaica and their influence with Akan culture and loanwords specifically from the Fante dialect of the Central Region of Ghana) in the language of Jamaican Maroon Creole or Kromanti. With the present state of technology, one can listen to live radio broadcasts in Akan from numerous radio stations and receive mass media and public broadcasts in Akan from numerous multimedia and media broadcasting. Akan is studied in major universities in North America and the United States, including Ohio University, Ohio State University, University of Wisconsin–Madison, Harvard University, Boston University, Indiana University, University of Michigan, and the University of Florida. The Akan language has been a regular language of study in the annual Summer Cooperative African Languages Institute (SCALI) program and the Akan language is regulated and administered by the Akan Orthography Committee (AOC). Some of Akan's language characteristic features include tone, vowel harmony, and nasalization.

Culture

Akan culture is one of the traditional matrilineal cultures of Africa. Akan art is wide-ranging and renowned, especially for the tradition of crafting bronze gold weights, using the lost-wax casting method. The Akan culture reached South America, the Caribbean, and North America.

Some of their most important mythological stories are called anansesem, literally meaning "the spider story", but in a figurative sense also meaning "traveler's tales". These "spider stories" are sometimes also referred to as nyankomsem: "words of a sky god". The stories generally, but not always, revolve around Kwaku Ananse, a trickster spirit, often depicted as a spider, human, or a combination thereof.

Elements of Akan culture also include, but are not limited to: 
 Akan art
 Kente cloth
 Adinkra symbols
 Outdooring naming ceremony
 Akan names
 Akan Calendar
 Akan Chieftaincy
 Akan gold weights
 Akan religion

Beliefs

Concepts of Akan philosophy and inheritance 

These are the basic concepts of Akan philosophy and inheritance:

Abusua – What an Akan inherits from his mother
Ntoro – What an Akan gets from his father, but one does not belong to a Ntoro; instead one belongs to one's Abusua 
Sunsum – What an Akan develops from interaction with the world
Kra – What an Akan gets from Nyame (God)

Matrilineality
Many but not all of the Akan still practice their traditional matrilineal customs, living in their traditional extended family households. The traditional Akan economic and political organization is based on matrilineal lineages, which are the basis of inheritance and succession.  A lineage is defined as all those related by matrilineal descent from a particular ancestress. Several lineages are grouped into a political unit headed by a council of elders, each of whom is the elected head of a lineage – which itself may include multiple extended-family households.

Public offices are, thus, vested in the lineage, as are land tenure and other lineage property. In other words, lineage property is inherited only by matrilineal kin. Each lineage controls the lineage land farmed by its members, functions together in the veneration of its ancestors, supervises marriages of its members, and settles internal disputes among its members.

The political units above are likewise grouped (into traditionally seven) but as of today, eight larger groups called abusua: Aduana, Agona, Asakyiri, Asenie, Asona, Bretuo, Ekuona, and Oyoko. The members of each such abusua are united by their belief that they are all descended from the same ancient ancestress – so marriage between members of the same group (or abusua) is forbidden, a taboo on marriage. One inherits or is a lifelong member of, the lineage, the political unit and the abusua of one's mother, regardless of one's gender or marriage. Members and their spouses thus belong to different abusuas, with mother and children living and working in one household, and their husband/father living and working in a different household.

According to one source of information about the Akan, "A man is strongly related to his mother's brother (wɔfa) but only weakly related to his father's brother.  This is perhaps viewed in the context of a polygamous society in which the mother/child bond is likely to be much stronger than the father/child bond. As a result, in inheritance, a man's nephew (his sister's son) (wɔfase) will have priority over his own son. Uncle-nephew relationships, therefore, assume a dominant position."

"The principles governing inheritance, generation, and age – that is to say, men come before women and seniors before juniors."... When a woman's brothers are available, a consideration of generational seniority stipulates that the line of brothers be exhausted before the right to inherit lineage property passes down to the next senior genealogical generation of sisters' sons. Finally, "it is when all possible male heirs have been exhausted that the females" may inherit.

Certain other aspects of the Akan culture are determined patrilineally rather than matrilineally. There are ancestrally 12 patrilineal Ntoro (spirit) groups, and everyone belongs to his or her father's Ntoro group, but not to his family lineage and abusua.  Each Ntoro group has its own surnames, taboos, ritual purifications, and forms of etiquette. A person thus inherits one's Ntoro from one's father but does not belong to his family.

A recent (2001) book provides an update on the Akan, stating that some families are changing from the above abusua structure to the nuclear family. Housing, childcare, education, daily work, and elder care, etc. are then handled by that individual family, rather than by the abusua or clan, especially in the city. The above taboo on marriage within one's abusua is sometimes ignored, but "clan membership" is still important, with many people still living in the abusua framework presented above.

Notable individuals of Akan origin

 Kwame Nkrumah (1909–1972) – started the pan-African movement, which liberated many states from European colonialism.
 Kofi Annan (1938–2018) – the first black man to head the United Nations organization. He was awarded the Nobel Prize
 Arthur Wharton (1865–1930) – the first black professional footballer in the world.
 Full List of Akan people (famous and notable individuals)

Gallery

See also
List of rulers of the Akan state of Adanse
List of rulers of the Akan states of Akwamu and Twifo-Heman
List of rulers of the Akan state of Bono-Tekyiman
List of rulers of the Akan state of Denkyira
List of rulers of the Akan state of Gyaaman
List of rulers of the Akan state of Akyem Abuakwa
List of rulers of Asante
Birimian
Geology of Ghana
Gyaaman
Tacky's War

Notes

References

Further reading

 Antubam, Kofi, Ghana's Heritage of Culture, Leipzig, 1963.
 Kyerematen, A. A. Y., Panoply of Ghana, London, 1964.
 Meyerowitz, Eva L. R., Akan Traditions of Origin, London, c. 1950.
 Meyerowitz, Eva L. R., At the Court of an African King, London 1962
 Obeng, Ernest E., Ancient Ashanti Chieftaincy, Tema (Ghana), 1986.
 Bartle, Philip F. W. (January 1978), "Forty Days; The AkanCalendar". Africa: Journal of the International African Institute (Edinburgh University Press), 48 (1): 80–84.
 For the Akan, the first-born twin is considered the younger, as the elder stays behind to help the younger out.
 "Kente Cloth." African Journey. webmaster@projectexploration.org. 25 September 2007.
 Effah-Gyamfi, Kwaku (1979), Traditional History of the Bono State, Legon: Institute of African Studies, University of Ghana.
 Effah-Gyamfi, Kwaku (1985), Bono Manso: an archaeological investigation into early Akan urbanism (African occasional papers, no. 2) Calgary: Dept. of Archaeology, University of Calgary Press. 
 Meyerowitz, E. L. R. (1949), "Bono-Mansu, the earliest centre of civilisation in the Gold Coast", Proceedings of the III International West African Conference, 118–20.
 Shumway, Rebecca. 2011. "The Fante and the Transatlantic Slave Trade." Rochester: University of Rochester Press.

External links

Kasahorow Akan Dictionary The Dictionary of Standard Written Akan
Akan gold trade
Akan Philosophy of the Person, Stanford Encyclopedia of Philosophy (2006) 

 
 
Indigenous peoples of West Africa
West African people
Ethnic groups in Ivory Coast
Ethnic groups in Ghana